The NKP Salve Challenger Trophy, commonly referred to as the Challenger Series, was an Indian List A cricket tournament organized by the Board of Control for Cricket in India (BCCI). Established in the 1994–1995 season, the tournament was played to showcase the country's talent and providing opportunities for younger players to make an impression. The tournament was played in October every year until the 2013–14 season before Ranji Trophy season.

From 1998 to 1999 the tournament was known as the NKP Salve Challenger Trophy, named after former Board of Control for Cricket in India president N. K. P. Salve  – the man who brought the World Cup to the sub-continent in 1987. The tournament was not played in 2002–03.

The annual tournament is played between three sides, consisting of 36 of the best players in India. The three teams were India Seniors, India A, and India B. Team names were changed for the 2006 version of this tournament. India Seniors became India Blue, India A became India Red, and India B became India Green. India Seniors has won 7 times, including the 2005–06 edition.

Winners

See also
 Cricket in India
 Deodhar Trophy
 Vijay Hazare Trophy

References

External links

NKP Salve Challenger on SPORT195 

Indian domestic cricket competitions
List A cricket competitions